The American Aviation Historical Society (AAHS) is a non-profit organization "dedicated to the preservation and dissemination of [the history of] American aviation." AAHS has had an educational program in promoting American aviation through its journal and a periodic newsletter, archives historical aviation documents and photos, maintains multiple websites on aviation history, and assists aviation historians and the public in the acquisition and exchange of aviation history information.

Administration, organization and meetings
The Society was founded in 1956, and currently has two offices.  Until 2017, all operations were headquartered in Huntington Beach, California. While the Membership Department remains in Huntington Beach, the headquarters office moved to the historic Flabob Airport in Riverside, California. The organization's annual meeting—open to all members—is held in California or Arizona, and commonly includes tours of some aviation historical interest.

The national organization is headquartered in the historic aviation-manufacturing region of Southern California, and conducts local activities from time to time. Additionally, there are chapters ("wings") in other parts of the United States, including Phoenix, Arizona and Northern Virginia, which conduct meetings and activities of their own. The organization lists chapters in Arizona, Florida, Michigan, Minnesota, Ohio, and Virginia. However, membership in the national organization is available to all interested parties the United States, whether served by a local chapter or not.

In the early 2000s, some chapters separated to become a separate organization. In Northern California, the San Francisco-area chapter (formed in 1985) separated in 2006 to become the Society for Aviation History, citing objections to the national organization's insurance requirements. The Dayton, Ohio region chapter ("Huffman Prairie Chapter") formed in 1990, but separated from AAHS in 2006 to become the Huffman Prairie Aviation History Society—citing objections to the national organization's demands regarding dues, officers, and meeting organization.

Operations and media

Publications
AAHS's primary activity is publishing a peer-reviewed quarterly aviation history journal, the 150-page glossy AAHS Journal',' distributed to members. The publication is available in both print and digital formats. The organization also produces a quarterly online newsletter, AAHS Flightline, which was originally distributed in print to members, but went online in the early 2000s, at the organization's website. The publications provide a venue for presentation of aviation history articles, historic documents and photos, and the exchange of information and resources among aviation historians.

Archives
The society also maintains an extensive library of aviation-related documents and photographs (reportedly over 2,000,000 photographs) The organization struggles to identify and catalog all the aviation and aircraft photos in its collection, and has turned to volunteers, in-person and online, to resolve a growing backlog of photographs—digitizing and documenting the photos for accessibility and usability.

Websites
AAHS has its own website (aahs-online.org), but also hosts the restored site of the U.S. Centennial of Flight Commission—a large online encyclopedia of U.S. aviation history.

It also provides links to an affiliated site, APT Collectibles, which catalogs and markets past issues of the AAHS Journal.

To help AAHS resolve its photo-identification backlog, AAHS's webmaster and managing editor, Hayden Hamilton, developed a web-based application called AAHS Planespotter, to allow scanned images to be downloaded by aviation enthusiasts, who can then fill in information to help identify the depicted aircraft by type, location, serial number or other characteristics, and then submit that information to AAHS's photo database.

Public service
AAHS is, from time to time, a venue for the exchange of information and ideas about aviation history, and a source for aviation history services. AAHS members are sometimes called upon give presentations on aviation history, to assist museums, educational institutions, or media, work in aviation history projects, programs or events, or engage in research, discussions and debates about issues of aviation history.press release: "Airplane Photography by William T. Larkins Presented in New Exhibition at San Francisco International Airport," September 8, 2004, San Francisco Airport Museums, San Francisco International Airport, retrieved May 3, 2021"About KAC", website of The Wichita Aviation Centennial / Kansas Aviation Centennial, retrieved May 3, 2021 They have provided assistance to the development of the Smithsonian Institution's National Air and Space Museum.photo: "American Aviation Historical Society Sorting Material," from January–February, 1967, The Smithsonian Torch, page 4, as excerpted online Smithsonian Institution, retrieved May 3, 2021;  Summary: "American Aviation Historical Society at Wednesday evening 'work session,' sorting material for the National Air Museum on one of the balconies in the Arts and Industries Building."

Key and notable people

The organization's advisory board has included aviation historians Gerald Balzer, Richard P. Hallion, Robert L. Lawson, and (until 2019) Walter J. Boyne, founding curator and later director of the National Air and Space Museum.

Key AAHS Journal authors have included:

 Ray Wagner, co-founder of the AAHS; former director and enshrine of the International Air and Space Hall of Fame
 Harold E. Morehouse, co-developer of the first Aeronca airplane and pioneer developer of the modern, air-cooled, light-aircraft engineMeadowcroft, Bill: "Driggs Skylark: Rover Engine", February 1982, Vintage Aircraft, Vol.10, No.2, p.8, EAA / Vintage Aircraft Association, retrieved from Issu.com May 2, 2021), who wrote the regular column "Flying Pioneers" profiling key early aviation pioneers (many of whom he had personally known)"AAHS Journal Volume 15 (1970) Table of Contents," APT Collectables (AAHS affiliate), retrieved May 1, 2021
 Peter M. Bowers, an EAA Homebuilders Hall of Fame enshrinee, author of 26 books and over 1,000 articles, Peter M. Bowers — 1918-2003:  Historian - Photographer - Homebuilder," on the website "BowersFlyBaby.com", retrieved May 3, 2021 who was a principal contributor from the initial AAHS Journal issue in 1956, through the late 1990s"AAHS Journal Volume 1 (1956) Table of Contents", APT Collectables (affiliate of AAHS), retrieved May 1, 2021"AAHS Journal Volume 11 (1966) Table of Contents", APT Collectables (affiliate of AAHS), retrieved May 1, 2021
 Joseph P. Juptner, EAA Hall of Fame inductee, whose book series U.S. Civil Aircraft is the principal historic catalog and encyclopedia of U.S. civilian aircraft from 1927 to 1948Bilstein, Roger E. (reviewer): "Reviewed Work: U.S. Civil Aircraft. Vol. 8 by Joseph P. Juptner", April, 1982, Technology and Culture, Vol. 23, No. 2, pp. 272-274, retrieved from JSTOR May 1, 2021"Joe Juptner", in Vintage Aircraft Association Hall of Fame, EAA / Vintage Aircraft Association, retrieved May 2, 2021
 Edward H. Phillips, principal aviation historian of the general aviation industry, and the "Air Capital City" (Wichita, Kansas), and its various historic aircraft manufacturers (Cessna Aircraft, Beech Aircraft, Stearman Aircraft, Travel Air, Laird/Swallow, and others)
 Paul R. Matt, noted aviation historian, principal U.S. historical illustrator/draftsman of early aircraftWildenberg, Thomas: "A Visionary Ahead of His Time: Howard Hughes and the U.S. Air Force — Part I: The Air Corps Design Competition," Fall 2007, Air Power History, Vol.54, No.3 (which notes: "As Paul Matt, the noted aviation historian explained in his classic article on Howard Hughes and his racer,..."), retrieved May 2, 2021
 Len Morgan, prominent aviation columnist, author and publisher
 John W. Underwood, author of 12 aviation history books, and numerous articles, and leading aviation history photographer/archivist. EAA / Vintage Aircraft Association Hall of Fame inductee"John Underwood Photographic Collection," San Diego Air and Space Museum, retrieved May 2, 2021"John W. Underwood", in 2011 EAA Halls of Fame EAA / Vintage Aircraft Association, retrieved May 2, 2021

See also
 List of aviation historical societies

References

External links
 American Aviation Historical Society official site
 Index for the AAHS Journal at Archive.org
 Centennial of Flight website, as archived by the American Aviation Historical Society
 AAHS Planespotter
 APT Collectables (AAHS Journal'') back issues cataloged)

History of aviation
Aviation magazines
History of Orange County, California
Historical societies in California
Organizations based in Santa Ana, California
Aviation organizations based in the United States